The 1996 United States presidential election in West Virginia took place on November 5, 1996, as part of the 1996 United States presidential election. Voters chose five representatives, or electors to the Electoral College, who voted for president and vice president.

West Virginia was easily won by President Bill Clinton (D-AR) over Senator Bob Dole (R-KS), with Clinton winning 51.51% to 36.76% by a margin of 14.75%. Billionaire businessman Ross Perot (Reform-TX) finished in third, with 11.26% of the popular vote.

, this is the last time that West Virginia supported a Democratic nominee, as Republican George W. Bush would narrowly win the state four years later, and, 20 years later, Hillary Clinton would lose the state by more than 40 points without carrying a single county. This was also the last election in which Mason County, Cabell County, Roane County, Ohio County, Jackson County, Pendleton County, Mercer County, Pleasants County, Monroe County, Lewis County, Hardy County, Raleigh County, Wayne County, Greenbrier County, Marshall County, Hancock County, Randolph County, Nicholas County, Taylor County, Barbour County, Wetzel County, Summers County, Calhoun County, Clay County, Gilmer County, Pocahontas County, Tyler County, and Tucker County voted for the Democratic candidate. This is also the last election in which the 1st and 2nd congressional districts voted for a Democrat and which any district voted Democratic by double digits.

Results

By congressional district
Clinton won all 3 congressional districts.

By county

Counties that flipped from Republican to Democratic
Hardy (Largest city: Moorefield)
Tyler (Largest city: Paden City)

References

West Virginia
1996
1996 West Virginia elections